Chiềng Sơ or Chong Su is a commune (xã) and village of the Điện Biên Đông District of Điện Biên Province, northwestern Vietnam.

References

Communes of Điện Biên province
Populated places in Điện Biên province